These are the official results of the Women's 5000 metres event at the 1999 IAAF World Championships in Seville, Spain. There were a total number of 44 participating athletes, with two qualifying heats and the final held on Friday 27 August 1999 at 21:15h.

Final

Heats
Held on Tuesday 24 August 1999

References
 

H
5000 metres at the World Athletics Championships
1999 in women's athletics